The Best Legs in the Eighth Grade is a 1984 made-for-television film about a corporation lawyer who is reunited with his high school ideal at a health club. He makes a date with her, which damages his current relationship. Starring Tim Matheson, Annette O'Toole, Kathryn Harrold and James Belushi. Teleplay by Bruce Feirstein. Directed by Tom Patchett.

External links
 
 

1984 television films
1984 films
1984 romantic comedy films
American romantic comedy films
Films with screenplays by Bruce Feirstein
1980s American films